"Nobody's Hero" is a song by Canadian progressive rock band Rush, released as the third single from their 1993 album Counterparts. The first verse deals with the AIDS-related death of a gay man named Ellis Booth, a friend of Neil Peart when Peart lived in London.  After the chorus, the second verse speaks of a girl who was murdered in Peart's hometown, Port Dalhousie and was the daughter of a family friend, as remembered by Peart in Far and Wide: Bring That Horizon to Me! The girl is rumoured to have been Kristen French, one of Paul Bernardo's victims.

It inspired the title for the paper Nobody's Hero: On Equal Protection, Homosexuality, and National Security published in The George Washington Law Review.

Track listing

Personnel
Geddy Lee – Bass, lead vocals
Alex Lifeson – Acoustic & electric guitars
Neil Peart – Drums, percussion
John Webster - Keyboards
with
Michael Kamen – String arrangements & conducting

See also
List of Rush songs

References

1993 songs
1994 singles
1990s ballads
Rush (band) songs
Rock ballads
LGBT-related songs
Commemoration songs
Songs written by Neil Peart
Songs written by Geddy Lee
Songs written by Alex Lifeson
Song recordings produced by Peter Collins (record producer)